Rory Macdonald may refer to:
 Rory Macdonald (musician) 
 Rory Macdonald (conductor) (born 1980), Scottish conductor
 Rory MacDonald (fighter) (born 1989), Canadian professional mixed martial artist